Back to Us is an album by Rascal Flatts.

Back to Us may also refer to:
 "Back to Us" (Rascal Flatts song)
 "Back to Us" (Keenan Cahill song)
 "Back to Us" (Don Diablo song)